Storyboards is the fourth full-length studio album by alternative rock band Sleeping at Last. It was released independently in 2009.

Track listing

External links

2009 albums
Sleeping at Last albums